The family Vampyrellidae is a subgroup of the order Aconchulinida (formerly Vampyrellida) within the phylum Cercozoa. Based on molecular sequence data, the family currently comprises the genus Vampyrella, and maybe several other vampyrellid amoebae (e.g. Gobiella). The cells are naked and characterised by radiating, filose pseudopodia (also referred to as filopodia) and an orange colouration of the main cell body.

In former times the family Vampyrellidae contained several genera (e.g. Vampyrella, Gobiella, Leptophrys, Platyreta, Theratromyxa) and was identical with the order Vampyrellida West, 1901, also known under the name "Aconchulinida". However, based on molecular sequence data it seemed reasonable to restrict the family Vampyrellidae to a subgroup (containing the genus Vampyrella) and to establish another family for the genera Leptophrys, Platyreta and Theratromyxa, namely the Leptophryidae Hess et al., 2012.

Characteristics

When free-floating, the cell is spherical and around 30 μm across, with long radially directed filose pseudopods as well as distinctive shorter club-shaped ones, so that it resembles a heliozoan. Moving, the cell stretches out and takes a more typical amoeboid form, with an obvious distinction between the clear periphery and pseudopods and the greenish interior.  In this form it finds its way into algae cells and feeds on their interiors. At least one genus, Theratromyxa, also feeds on soil nematodes. A few other vampyrellids are parasitic on fungi. As such, these vampyrellids can be an important control of parasitic rust fungus of wheat and other crops.

Vampyrellids characteristically have mitochondria with tubular cristae. Together with the nucleariids they include the majority of the naked filose amoebae.

Systematics and Phylogeny

Clades and Genera
There are at least 45 credibly described species that are either proved or likely to belong to the order Vampyrellida, falling into 14 genera, which can be grouped into 5 clades:
Leptophryidae Hess, Sausen & Melkonian, 2012
Arachnomyxa Hess, 2017
Leptophrys Hertwig & Lesser, 1874
Planctomyxa Hess, 2017
Platyreta Cavalier-Smith & Bass, 2008
Theratromyxa Zwillenberg, 1952
Vernalophrys Gong et al. 2015

Placopodidae Jahn, 1928 = Hyalodiscidae Poche, 1913
Placopus Schulze, 1875 = Hyalodiscus Hertwig & Lesser, 1874

Sericomyxidae More, Simpson & Hess, 2021
Sericomyxa More et al. 2021

Thalassomyxa clade
Thalassomyxa Grell, 1985

Vampyrellidae Zopf, 1885
Vampyrella Cienkowski, 1865

Vampyrellida incertae sedis
Arachnula Cienkowski, 1876 (potential synonym with Thalassomyxa, Leptophryidae)
Asterocaelum Canter, 1973 (? Leptophryidae)
Lateromyxa Hülsmann, 1993
Monadopsis Klein, 1882

Genera with uncertain phylogenetic affinity
Gobiella Cienkowski, 1881 (putative amoeboid heterokont alga, ≈Chlamydomyxa)
Vampyrellidium Zopf, 1885 (nucleariid amoebae)
Vampyrelloides Schepotieff, 1912 = Protogenes Trichense, 1885
Vampyrina Frenzel, 1893

Phylogenetic Tree

References

External links

http://starcentral.mbl.edu/microscope/portal.php?pagetitle=assetfactsheet&imageid=932
http://tolweb.org/tree?group=The_other_protists&contgroup=Eukaryotes

Aconchulinida
Cercozoa families
Taxa named by Friedrich Wilhelm Zopf